Mathieu Bois (born July 6, 1988) is a competition swimmer from Canada, who mostly competes in the breaststroke events.  He claimed bronze medals in the men's 100-metre breaststroke, and the 4x100-metre medley relay, at the 2007 Pan American Games in Rio de Janeiro, Brazil.  Bois made his Olympic debut at the 2008 Summer Olympics in Beijing, China.

References
Profile Canadian Olympic Committee

1988 births
Living people
Canadian male breaststroke swimmers
Olympic swimmers of Canada
Sportspeople from Longueuil
Sportspeople from Quebec
Swimmers at the 2006 Commonwealth Games
Swimmers at the 2007 Pan American Games
Swimmers at the 2008 Summer Olympics
Pan American Games bronze medalists for Canada
Pan American Games medalists in swimming
Medalists at the 2007 Pan American Games
Commonwealth Games competitors for Canada